Perfect Obedience (Spanish: Obediencia perfecta) is a 2014 Mexican film directed by Luis Urquiza. It won the Grand Prix des Amériques, the main prize at the Montreal World Film Festival.

Cast
Juan Manuel Bernal: Padre Ángel de la Cruz
Alfonso Herrera: Julián 'Sacramento' Santos (adult)
Sebastián Aguirre Boëda: Julián 'Sacramento' Santos
Juan Ignacio Aranda: Padre Galaviz
Luis Ernesto Franco: Padre Robles
Miguel Ángel Loyo: Andrés Lomelí
Lucia González de León: Serva di Cristo
Juan Carlos Colombo: Padre Ángel de la Cruz (anziano)

References

External links

2014 films
Mexican drama films